The CorpBanca Tower is a high-rise office building located in the city of Caracas, Venezuela. It is known for being the tallest skyscraper in the Financial Center of the Golden Mile of Caracas with 124 meters and 30 floors, a title that will be held in the future by the neighboring CAF Tower, when it is completed.

See also 
List of tallest buildings in South America

References 

http://www.skyscrapercenter.com/caracas/torre-corpbanca/11285/
Buildings and structures in Caracas
Skyscraper office buildings in Venezuela
Office buildings completed in 1966